The 1956 NASCAR Grand National (now NASCAR Cup Series) Season began on November 13, 1955, and ended on November 18, 1956, lasting slightly longer than a full year. Driver Tim Flock was the defending champion, and started off with a win at the opening Hickory Speedway, but it was Buck Baker who captured the championship.  Along with the trophies, Baker also collected $34,076.35 in prize money, and finished more than 400 points ahead of his closest competitor.  Baker competed in 48 races throughout the 1956 season as Speedy Thompson and Herb Thomas rounded out the top three in points by the final race.   Even though auto manufactures Chevrolet and Ford both contributed millions of dollars into their cars during the season, it was Carl Kiekhaefer's Chryslers and Dodges that dominated the season including a 16 win stretch through the summer months.

1956 Season Recap 

The season started on a somber note; as former driver Buddy Shuman died the night before the season started, in a Hickory hotel fire.  The coroner reported that the mattress had been on fire, and it appeared that Shuman had attempted to escape, but broke down the bathroom door instead of the hallway.  Shuman had been put in charge of the factory effort by Ford to succeed in NASCAR.

Buck Baker won the NASCAR Grand National championship with 14 wins in the 1956 race season.  The season involved races on 40 dirt tracks, 3 road courses, and 2 superspeedways. More than 300 drivers competed in at least one race throughout the season With Baker and Speedy Thompson competing in 48 of the 56 races.  Baker finished the season with 31 top five finishes, 39 top ten, and 12 poles.

Baker had been improving his season finishing position for a couple years; with a 4th place finish in 1953, 3rd in 1954, and runner-up in 1955.  For the 1956 season Baker joined the Carl Kiekhaefer team who already boasted Speedy Thompson and Tim Flock.  The powerhouse Kiekhaifer team finished with a total of 30 races in the 56 race season, including 16 straight races by 4 different drivers during one stretch of the season. Baker took home the championship, Thompson finished second, and Flock only started 4 races for Kiekhaifer but still brought home a 9th place for his season efforts.  Flock quit the Kiekhaifer team part way into the season citing a overly oppressive and driven to win Kiekhaifer.  Rules and living arrangements were established by Kiekhaifer; Husbands and wives as well as driver and girlfriends were not allowed to share quarters the night before the race. Herb Thomas replaced Flock on the team, but he refused to remain for the whole season as well.

The Races

1955 

Race 1: Hickory Speedway
On November 13, 1955 at Hickory Speedway 7500 people watched as the 1956 NASCAR season got underway, with Tim Flock capturing the win in one of Carl Kiekhaefer's Mercury Outboard motors sponsored Chryslers.  Flock started on the pole and led the first 121 laps of the 200 lap event before spinning in turn three.  Lee Petty took the lead and led through lap 138 when Flock caught and passed him; then Flock led from lap 139 to finish.  Petty would finish third behind Flock and Curtis Turner, with Dink Widenhouse and Jim Paschal rounding out the top 5. There were 4 cautions on the .4 mile dirt track, for a total of 23 laps.

Race 2: Charlotte Speedway
Race 2 the following week took place at the 3/4 mile dirt track Charlotte Speedway.  Tim Flock's brother Flonty, who also drove for Kiekhaefer, would lead the race from start to finish, narrowly edged out his brother Tim by half a car length. Lee Petty, Joe Weatherly and, Buck Baker would round out the top five.  This would be Kiekhaefer's 10th win in 12 races, dating back to the 1955 season.

Race 3: Willow Springs Raceway
Meanwhile in California at Willow Springs Raceway, NASCAR was also running a 200 mile road race.  Chuck Stevenson grabbed that win in his 1956 Ford; followed by Marvin Panch and Johnny Mantz as November came to a close.

Race 4: Palm Beach Speedway
On December 11 the series, along with 4500 spectators, gathered at the Palm Beach Speedway in West Palm Beach, Florida.  The race is notable in that the first two drivers across the finish line, Joe Weatherly and Jim Reed, were disqualified due to technical violations.  The race was awarded to Herb Thomas.  Although Weatherly and Reed finished more than a lap ahead of Thomas NASCAR found that their cars were no strictly stock.  Weatherly had a special cam installed, and Reed was found to be using modified valves, and both were stripped of their finishing positions.  Thomas won the 200 lap, half mile track, race in an hour and a half. Al Keller finished second, Billy Myers grabbed the third spot with Buck Baker and Lee Petty rounding out the top 5.  After the race Big Bill France announced that anyone caught cheating again would not only forfeit their finishing position, but their prize money and all their season points to date as well. This ended the 1955 year for NASCAR racing, and January 22, 1956 would begin the titular 1956 season.

1956 begins 

Race 5: Arizona State Fairgrounds
Race number 5 was contested at the Arizona State Fairgrounds where Buck Baker in his 55 Chrysler grabbed the first win of the new year, and Kiekhaefer drivers Billy Meyers and Ralph Moody captured second and third.  Baker's victory was his first start for the juggernaut Kiekhaefer team.  When Kiekhaefer realized how formidable Baker was on the track he was quoted as saying "There's only one thing to do with a man like that; and that is to hire him." Slowed by 8 cautions, the one mile dirt track hosted the 150 mile race in two and a half hours.

Race 6: Daytona Beach and Road Course
On February 25, the day before the scheduled Grand National race, Daytona Beach Beach & Road Course hosted convertibles, their drivers, and owners assembled and ran the first NASCAR Convertible Division race.  Along with drivers, owners, mechanics and, officials, 13,500 spectators gathered at the 4.1 mile road course to watch Curtis Turner in his 56 Ford convertible beat Fireball Roberts and 26 other drivers to the checkered flag through 160 miles of racing. 
The next day on February 26, the Grand National series cars raced on Daytona Beach.  Team owner KKiekhaefer fielded 6 of his drivers for the race: Buck Baker, Tim Flock, his brother Fonty Flock, Charlie Scott, Frank Munday and Speedy Thompson.  Tim Flock survived the track and 70-plus other drivers to win the race, marking his second in a row win at the beach. Charlie Scott was noted as a 19th-place finisher, and being one of the first African-American drivers in NASCAR. The race was flagged to a stop 2 laps before the scheduled 160 miles due to a high tide on the beach.

Race 7: Daytona Palm Beach Speedway
For the next race on March 4 the drivers returned to Palm Beach Speedway for race number 7, a 100 mile event.  Once again disqualification would play a part in who received the winner accolades.  Al Keller beat Billy Meyer to the checkered flag, but was found to running with modified pistons, and Keller was awarded the victory.  Buck Baker and Herb Thomas grabbed the second and third spots respectively.

Race 8: Wilson Speedway
On March 18 5000 spectators gathered for Race 8; which was contested on the half mile dirt track of Wilson Speedway.  Herb Thomas captured his second win of the season in a Smokey Yunick prepared Chevy when rain cut the scheduled 200 lap event to 106 laps.

Race 9: Lakewood Speedway
The following week the Grand National series traveled to the one mile dirt track of Lakewood Speedway in Atlanta Georgia.  The event was darkened by the death of Lou Moore who suffered a intracerebral hemorrhage while at the track, and died in the hospital before the end of the race. Moore was a well known Indianapolis 500 car driver, builder and owner.  Buck Baker came away with the Wilson Speedway win, and Speedy Thompson finished second, giving Kiekhaefer another 1-2 finish and bringing the March contests to a close.

Spring of '56 

Race 10: Wilkes County 160

The new month and race 10 would bring one of the 1956 season's biggest turning points as April 8 ushered the NASCAR crew to .6 mile North Wilkesboro Speedway in North Wilkesboro, N.C. for the Wilkes County 160.  Tim Flock posted his third win of the season, and Billy Myers finished second, as 7500 spectators looked on.  Jim Paschal grabbed the third spot, as Herb Thomas and Ralph Moody rounded out the top 5.  The news of the day was when Flock shocked the NASCAR family and abruptly quit the highly successful Kiekhaefer Chrysler team after the race, citing worsening ulcers and Kiekhaefer's attitude as the reasons. Kiekhaefer tried to convince Flock to stay with the team, but Flock was adamant about leaving for a Chevy team.

Race 11: Langhorne Speedway
Race number 11 was at the 1 mile dirt track of Langhorne Speedway, in Langhorne, PA on April 22.  Tragedy struck once again as young driver John McVitty died of massive internal injuries after being thrown from his car as it rolled the day before the race during qualifying. To fill the empty seat left by Flock's leaving, and now driving a Smokey Yunick prepared ride, Kiekhaefer hired Herb Thomas to join his NASCAR team. Flock moved into the lead on lap 115, but would give way to eventual winner Buck Baker with six laps remaining in the 150 lap event. Thomas finished second and Flock dropped to third by the end of the race.

Race 12: Atlantic Rural Fairgrounds
April 29 brought 5000 spectators to the Atlantic Rural Fairgrounds for the Richmond 100 mile event on the half mile dirt track.  Buck Baker dominated, leading all but two laps and lapped the entire field including second place Herb Thomas by the time the checkered flag fell.  Backer's win coupled with Flocks last place finish moved Baker into first place in the standings.

Race 13: Arclite 100
Race number 13 on May 5 saw Speedy Thompson win the 100 miler in Concord N.C., and marked the fourth consecutive race that the Kiekhaefer cars fished 1-2.  The win at Columbia Speedway brought Thompson career total to 5, and was his first of the 1955 season.  Buck Baker finished second in his number 500B, and the number 9 of Joe Weatherly snagged the number 3 spot.  Tiny Lund and Bob Flock rounded out the top 5 while 5000 people looked on for an hour and 50 minutes.

Race 14: Harris Speedway
The next day of the double-duty weekend had the NASCAR family gathering at Harris Speedway in Concord NC for a 100 mile event on their half-mile dirt track.  Speedy Thompson grabbed his second checkered flag in a row, besting Buck Baker and Herb Thomas who finished second and third respectively. It was another 1-2-3 victory for the powerful Kiekhaefer team.  Thompson led all but one lap in the one hour and 37 minute event.

Race 15: Greenville-Pickens Speedway
Fans and drivers gathered for race 15 at the Greenville-Pickens Speedway in SC on Thursday to watch Buck Baker give Kiekhaefer his 7th victory in a row.  That May 10 would not go quietly into the record books however.  After Baker managed to run the full 200 laps on the half-mile dirt track without a single pit stop, Schwam Motor Co., who fielded Fords for Joe Weatherly and Curtis Turner, went to NASCAR officials and filed a protest against the Kiekhaefer team.  An enraged Kiekhaefer filed a counter protest against the Schwam Fords, claiming they ran with illegal motors and rear-ends.  Technical inspector Jim Ross reviewed both claims, and held that both cars were legal, giving Baker a 100 point lead in the standings. The final results for the race were that the 500B Chrysler of Baker's was the winner, Curtis Turner in his number 99 second, and Joe Eubanks third.  Gwyn Staley and Joe Weatherly rounded out the top five.

Race 16: Hickory Speedway 
On May 12 the Grand National series returned to the Hickory Speedway.  While 4500 people looked on Speedy Thompson led the race from start to finish.  The race was filled with cautions, 6 in total throughout the 200 lap event.  There were no driver injuries, and Billy Meyers finished second with Buck Baker, Herb Thomas, and Gwyn Stanley filling out the top five spots.  Thompson's win gave Kiekhaefer his eighth straight win.

Race 17: Orange Speedway 
Race 17 was run on May 13 at the .9 mile Orange Speedway dirt track in Hillboro, NC.  In a near photo finish Buck Baker barely squeaked past Speedy Thompson at the end of the 90 mile event.  Number 9 for Kiekhaefer as 7500 people enjoyed the 1 hour race.

Race 18: Virginia 500 

May 20 brought everyone to the picturesque half-mile paved track of Martinsville Speedway.  The 20,000 strong spectator collective enjoyed a 4 hour, 500 lap event with seven caution flags.  The newly named event had Speedy Thompson leading a race high 259 laps, but falling to Buck Baker on lap 382.  Baker never lost the lead after passing Thompson, and Kiekhaefer had win number 10.  Lee Petty, Paul Goldsmith and Gwyn Stanley finished third through fifth respectively

Race 19: Lincoln Speedway  
Five days after the Martinsville race 17 drivers competed on the half-mile dirt track of Lincoln Speedway for 200 laps.  Another close finish, and the man who once drove buses, Buck Baker, grabbed his third win in a row.  Billy Myers led the first 43 laps until his fuel pump failed, and pole sitter Speedy Thompson retired on lap 97 with a hole in his radiator.  Lee Petty put on a show for the fans when he lost a lap after spinning on lap 21.  Petty then drove back into the lead lap, and into contention with some yellow flag help.  Only eight cars completed the race, and Baker, Jim Paschal, Petty, Herb Thomas, and Nace Mattingly were the top five.

Race 20, 21: Charlotte Speedway, Portland Speedway: 
On May 27 NASCAR once again hosted a double-decker race day.  Returning to the Charlotte Speedway three quarter mile track, Kiekhaefer drivers once again finished 1-2-3 as Speedy Thompson, newly acquired Junior Johnson, and points leader Buck Baker finished in the coveted top three spots.  Thompson's win was number 12 for Kiekhaefer.  Across the country at the Portland Speedway in Oregon, driver Herb Thomas added another win for the powerful Kiekhaefer team.  John Kieper finished second and Clyde Palmer finished third. 

Race 22, 23: Redwoood Speedway, Syracuse Mile
Three days later on May 30 NASCAR once again pulled double duty with races at each end of the country.  One contingent gathered at the Redwood Speedway in California.  The race was halted early due to poor track conditions with ruts and holes in the .624 dirt track and swirling dust storms which made the track unsafe to race on.  After 78 of a scheduled 100 miles, Herb Thomas walkeded away with another win.  Crosscountry at the New York State Fairgrounds in Syracuse NY, drivers battled for 150 miles on the 1 mile dirt oval.  The Kiekhaefer team grabbed the second win of the day with Buck Baker in his Chrysler besting Jim Paschal in his Merc. by 3 laps.

Summer of '56 

Race 24: Merced Fairgrounds
Herb Thomas wins easily in Merced , CA., in the 100-mile event.  The win was the 16th consecutive win for the Carl Kiekhaefer team and it is a record that still stands as of 2019, and is unlikely to be broken in the modern era.  The win streak ended on June 10.

Race 25: West Memphis Speedway
It's June 10 when Ralph Moody wins at West Memphis Speedway in a DePaolo Engineering Ford, breaking the stranglehold that the Kiekhaefer team has had on the field for 16 races, dating back to the middle of March.

Race 26: Southern States Fairgrounds
6/15/56	in Charlotte, NC the Southern States Fairgrounds was the scene of Speedy Thompson winning a 200 lap event on the half mile dirt track by 5 laps in his Chrysler over nearest competitor Curtis Turner.  Lee Petty finished third with Fireball Roberts and Buck Baker bringing up the 4th and 5th spots.

Race 27: Monroe County Fairgrounds
For the June 22nd race the NASCAR family traveled north to the New York, for another 200 laps on a half mile dirt track where Speedy Thompson makes it back to back victories by a full lap over Jim Paschal and Herb Thomas.  Buck Baker finished fourth to give the Kiekhaefer team 3 of the top four finishing spots.  Six Thousand fans showed up to watch 21 drivers compete for the checkered flag.

Race 28: Portland Speedway
On 6/24/56 across the country in Portland, OR John Kieper grabbed a win in his own 56 Olds.  The paved half mile Portland Speedway was witness to the hour and a half race.

On July 4, Fireball Roberts wins Raleigh Speedway after 250 miles, his first on a super-speedway.  Kiekhaefer files a protest with NASCAR officials claiming Robert's flywheel weight was illegal.  At that time NASCAR didn't have scales at the track; they took the flywheel to a fish market to weigh it, and Roberts's victory stood. Roberts' win is upheld by NASCAR.

On October 23 NASCAR heads into Shelby N.C. for a 100 mile race.  At the time Herb Thomas led the standings by 246 points.

Season Standings

Notes

References

Bibliography

External links 
 1956 Season stats from Racing Reference
 1956 point standings from Racing Reference
 http://www.legendsofnascar.com/56_63.htm
 https://auto.howstuffworks.com/auto-racing/nascar/season-recaps/1950s/1956-nascar.htm 
 https://auto.howstuffworks.com/auto-racing/nascar/season-recaps/1950s/1956-nascar1.htm
 https://auto.howstuffworks.com/auto-racing/nascar/season-recaps/1950s/1956-nascar-results.htm 

 

NASCAR Cup Series seasons

NASCAR seasons